The 1921 Buffalo All-Americans season was their second in the league. The team matched their previous output of 9–1–1, going 9–1–2 against league opponents, and losing the league title to the Chicago Staleys in a disputed tiebreaker.

Philadelphia Quakers moonlighting controversy and absorption of Detroit Heralds

During the 1921 season, several of the Buffalo All-Americans, most notably future Philadelphia Eagles co-founder Lud Wray, also played for the Philadelphia Quakers, an independent club based in Philadelphia, Pennsylvania. Since Philadelphia was subject to blue laws in the commonwealth of Pennsylvania, the Quakers had to play their games on Saturdays, as opposed to the Sundays used by the APFA, including Buffalo. The Buffalo players played for Philadelphia on Saturday, then traveled back to Buffalo for Sunday's game. A few days before Buffalo played Canton, the league found out about violation of league policy, and made the players choose which team they wanted to play for. Five, including Wray, chose to stay with the Quakers, blaming the Buffalo management for "blowing the whistle." Buffalo was able to hire players from the Detroit Heralds, who folded midseason, to complete their roster.

De facto championship game

The Chicago Staleys (to be renamed the Chicago Bears after the end of the season), led by wide receiver George Halas, and the Buffalo All-Americans, led by quarterback Tommy Hughitt and fullback Catchy Oliphant, were the two top teams in the league; each playing all of their games at home, Buffalo and Chicago amassed 6–0 records in league play. On Thanksgiving 1921, Buffalo played one of its only road games of the season, in Chicago, and prevailed 7–6. Chicago demanded a rematch.

The All-Americans agreed to rematch the Staleys on December 4, again in Chicago, on the condition that the game would be considered a "post-season" exhibition game not to be counted in the standings; had it not, Buffalo would have had an undefeated season and won the title. (Buffalo had played, and defeated, the Akron Pros just one day prior.) Chicago defeated Buffalo, who did not have the services of the Heralds players it had borrowed (they were playing against the Detroit Maroons the same day), in the rematch by a score of 10–7. Halas rebutted that the second game was played on December 4 (well before teams typically stopped playing games in those days), and the Staleys played two more games against top opponents, the Canton Bulldogs and Chicago Cardinals after the second Buffalo game (though, at the time of the Buffalo-Chicago matchup, Chicago had played three fewer games than Buffalo).

The league counted the All-Americans game in the standings, against Buffalo's wishes, resulting in Buffalo (9–1–2) and Chicago (9–1–1) being tied atop the standings. The league then implemented the first ever tiebreaker: a rule, now considered archaic and removed from league rulebooks, that states that if two teams play multiple times in a season, the last game between the two teams carries more weight. Thus, the Chicago victory actually counted more in the standings, giving Chicago the championship. Buffalo sports fans have been known to refer to this, justly or unjustly, as the "Staley Swindle," and have cited it as the first evidence of a sports curse on the city.

Oliphant was the most valuable player for the All-Americans as he led the league in scoring; (47 points), FGs (5) and PATs (26), 1 touchdown; he also led the league in touchdown passes (7).

Schedule

Game in italics was against a non-NFL team, is therefore not counted in league standings.

Standings

References

Buffalo All-Americans seasons
Buffalo All-Americans
Buffalo All-Americans